Claudia Zornoza Sánchez (born 20 October 1990) is a Spanish professional footballer who plays as a midfielder for Liga F club Real Madrid CF and the Spain women's national team.

International career
Zornoza made her senior international debut in March 2016, starting a 0–0 friendly draw with Romania in Mogoșoaia.

Titles
 1 Spanish League (2011)

References

External links
Profile at La Liga

1990 births
Living people
Footballers from Madrid
Spanish women's footballers
Women's association football midfielders
CF Pozuelo de Alarcón Femenino players
Rayo Vallecano Femenino players
Atlético Madrid Femenino players
Valencia CF Femenino players
Real Sociedad (women) players
Levante UD Femenino players
Primera División (women) players
Spain women's youth international footballers
Spain women's international footballers